Germain Derycke (2 November 1929, in Bellegem – 13 January 1978, in Kortrijk) was a Belgian road bicycle racer. Derycke was a classics specialist. In his second year as a professional he came second in Liège–Bastogne–Liège. In 1953 he won Paris–Roubaix. He twice stood on the podium at the world road race championship, second to Fausto Coppi in 1953 and third in 1955 behind Stan Ockers and Jean-Pierre Schmitz.

Major results

1951
1st stage 23 Tour de France
1952
1st Halle–Ingooigem
1953
 1st Paris–Roubaix
1st Tour d'Algérie
2nd  Road race, UCI Road World Championships
1954
1st La Flèche Wallonne
1st Dwars door Vlaanderen
1955
1st Milan–San Remo
3rd  Road race, UCI Road World Championships
1956
1st stages 2 & 3 Paris–Nice
1st Omloop Mandel-Leie-Schelde
1957
1st Liège–Bastogne–Liège
1st Tre Valli Varesine
1958
1st Tour of Flanders

References

External links

Official Tour de France results for Germain Derycke

1929 births
1978 deaths
Belgian male cyclists
Belgian Tour de France stage winners
Sportspeople from Kortrijk
Cyclists from West Flanders